"The Real Thing" is a song recorded by British singer, songwriter and actress Lisa Stansfield for her 1997 eponymous album. It was released as the first proper single from Lisa Stansfield in Europe, Australia and Japan on 10 March 1997, after "People Hold On" (The Bootleg Mixes). The song is written by Stansfield and Ian Devaney, and produced by Devaney and Peter Mokran. The CD single included remixes created by prominent US and UK producers: Mark Picchiotti, K-Klass and the Dirty Rotten Scoundrels. "The Real Thing" reached number ten in Italy and number nine on the UK Singles Chart. In August 1997, it was featured on the Money Talks soundtrack. Later, it was included on The Remix Album and Biography: The Greatest Hits.

In 2014, remixes of "The Real Thing" were included on the deluxe 2CD + DVD re-release of Lisa Stansfield. Additional remixes were featured on People Hold On ... The Remix Anthology (2014). The previously unreleased remix, Silk's Real House Thang was also included. All was included on The Collection 1989–2003.

Critical reception

"The Real Thing" received positive reviews from many music critics. Swedish newspaper Aftonbladet stated that the song is a "real hit". George Bowie from Evening Times declared it a "stunning" new single. Caroline Sullivan for The Guardian complimented "those lush cellos and saxes [that] envelop [it]", describing it as a song about "adultery". Irish Independent picked it as one of the "moments" of the Lisa Stansfield album, calling it "superb". Dominic Pride from Music & Media noted that it has "sharp horns and an anthemic chorus." Ralph Tee from Music Weeks RM wrote, "Vocally she's as great as ever, the song melodic and chirpy if not particularly ground breaking." A reviewer from People Magazine said that Stansfield is "singing circles around the wah-wah-spiked melodies" of "Never Gonna Fall" and "The Real Thing", "without resorting to gut-busting theatrics." Press of Atlantic City opined that the singer "shines" on "the horn-spiced" song. Natasha Stovall from Rolling Stone constated that "the heat comes from Stansfield, who belts her heart out in a voice that's smooth and pliant when she's falling in love again."

Chart performance
"The Real Thing" was a major hit on the charts in Europe, peaking at number-one in Spain. It was a top 5 hit in Hungary, peaking at number four, while peaking at number nine in the UK and number ten in Italy. In the UK, the single peaked in its first week at the UK Singles Chart, on 16 March 1997. It is Stansfield's last top 10 hit in the UK to date. On the UK R&B Chart, it was a even bigger hit, reaching number three. Additionally, "The Real Thing" was a top 20 hit in Scotland, a top 30 hit in Belgium and Poland, and a top 40 hit in Iceland. Outside Europe, it charted in Australia, peaking at number 124.

Music video
An accompanying music video was produced to promote the single, directed by Irish filmmaker Michael Geoghegan. It was later published on Stansfield's official YouTube channel in January 2014. The video has amassed more than 8,7 million views as of September 2021.

In the video, we follow three different young people. Stansfield appears as a mysterious figure with magical abilities, watching and singing to them. The first scene is at the home of a young woman, who are apparently upset and hiding in her bedroom. As Stansfield sings, magic dust appears on a phone. After taking the call, the woman is smiling and on her way out. The next scene is at a hair salon, where a female hairdresser are closing. With Stansfield there, magic dust appears so the door sign turns from 'Closed' to 'Open' again. A man then enters and after the woman is persuaded, she starts shaving off his hair. Magic dust appears on the machine cutter, and in the next moment they are embracing and kissing each other. In the last scene, the singer is in a nightclub. A gay man is sitting by himself, watching another man who is talking to his friends. Clearly down, he is getting ready to leave. After Stansfield walks up to him and singing to him, magic dust then appears over him. Couraged by this, he gets in touch with the other man, who willingly leaves his friends to join the man. As the video ends, people in the club are watching the couple leaving while Stansfield sings the last stanzas. 
 
Track listings

 European CD single"The Real Thing" (Radio Edit) – 4:01 
"The Real Thing" (Mark!'s Radio Edit) – 3:56

 Australian/European/Japanese/UK CD maxi-single"The Real Thing" (Radio Edit) – 4:01
"The Real Thing" (Touch Mix) – 5:36
"The Real Thing" (Dirty Rotten Scoundrels's Vocal Mix) – 7:10
"People Hold On" (Jon Is The Don Mix) – 8:08

 Australian/UK CD maxi-single #2"The Real Thing" (Radio Edit) – 4:01 
"The Real Thing" (Mark!'s Radio Edit) – 3:56 
"The Real Thing" (Mark!'s Good Time Disco Vocal) – 11:25
"The Real Thing" (Mark!'s Shelter Vocal) – 9:48
"The Real Thing" (K-Klassic Mix) – 8:39

 European/UK 12" single"The Real Thing" (Mark!'s Good Time Disco Vocal) – 11:25
"The Real Thing" (K-Klassic Mix) – 8:39
"The Real Thing" (Dirty Rotten Scoundrel's Vocal Mix) – 7:38

 Japanese promotional CD single"The Real Thing" (Mega Pop Mix) – 4:32 
"The Real Thing" (Hip Hop Mix) – 4:48
"The Real Thing" (Yutenji Mix) – 4:53
"The Real Thing" (Radio Edit) – 4:01

 UK promotional 12" single"The Real Thing" (Mark!'s Genuine Dub) 
"The Real Thing" (Dirty Rotten Scoundrels Dub Mix)
"The Real Thing" (Bunker Dub)

 UK promotional 12" single"The Real Thing" (Touch Mix) – 5:36
"The Real Thing" (Touch Extended Mix) – 6:27

 Other remixes'
"The Real Thing" (K-Klass Mix) – 4:44
"The Real Thing" (Silk's Real House Thang) – 9:45

Charts

Weekly charts

Year-end charts

References

LGBT-related songs
Lisa Stansfield songs
1997 singles
Songs written by Lisa Stansfield
1997 songs
Arista Records singles
Songs written by Ian Devaney
Music videos directed by Michael Geoghegan